Kashgar Prefecture, also known as Kashi Prefecture, is located in southwestern Xinjiang, China, located in the Tarim Basin region (roughly the southern half of Xinjiang). The capital of the prefecture is the city of Kashgar which has a population 506,640.

Kashgar Prefecture borders the Gorno-Badakhshan Autonomous Region of Tajikistan, Badakhshan Province of Afghanistan, Gilgit-Baltistan of India and Ladakh of India in the far south.

History
After the Communist takeover, Kashgar Prefecture and Yarkant Prefecture were established.

In 1902, a magnitude 7.7 earthquake struck the prefecture. It caused extreme devastation, destroying 30,000 homes and killing as many as 10,000 people.

One of the most mysterious events that occurred in the early 1950s (and perhaps earlier), was the closure of the Indian Consulate in Kashgar.

In 1955, Barin, Jamaterek and Ujme, which were part of Yengisar County, became part of Akto County and Bulungkol was transferred to Akto County in Kizilsu from Tashkurgan County in today's Kashgar Prefecture.

In June 1956, Yarkant Prefecture was dissolved and made part of Kashgar Prefecture.

In January 1979, Kashgar zhuānqū Prefecture  became Kashgar dìqū Prefecture .

In August 1982, Kashgar Prefecture opened a frontier post to exchange goods with Pakistan.

In 1992, it was proposed for 500,000 persons displaced by the Three Gorges Dam project, primarily Han Chinese, to be relocated to Kashgar Prefecture. The plans were met with widespread criticism in Xinjiang and internationally and were dropped.

In February 2002, a 6.7 magnitude earthquake killed 267 people in Maralbexi County and Payzawat County.

After a lengthy detention, in December 2009, Alimujiang Yimiti / Alimjan Yimit, Uyghur leader of an unregistered Christian church, was sentenced to 15 years in jail by the Kashgar Prefecture Intermediate People's Court for "illegally providing state secrets or intelligence to foreign entities". In 2008, his detention was ruled in violation of international standards of due process by the UN Working Group on Arbitrary Detention.

Geography
Most of the prefecture has a cold desert climate.

The second-highest peak on Earth, K2, is located on the China–Pakistan border in southern Kashgar Prefecture in an area claimed by India as part of the Trans-Karakoram Tract.

Administrative divisions

Demographics
As of the end of 2017, 4,295,200 of the 4,649,700 residents of the prefecture were Uyghur, 288,000 were Han Chinese and 66,500 were from other ethnic groups.

The population of Kashgar Prefecture was 4,499,158 according to the 2015 census. It has a population density of 35.5 inhabitants per km2.

As of 2015, 4,140,255 of the 4,499,158 residents of the prefecture were Uyghur, 292,972 were Han Chinese and 65,931 were from other ethnic groups.

The population growth of Kashgar declined significantly between 2015 and 2018.

As of 1999, 89.37% of the population of Kashgar (Kasi) Prefecture was Uyghur and 9.1% of the population was Han Chinese.

In 1997, the population of Kashgar Prefecture was 3,145,000 with Uyghurs making up 89.4% of the total.

As of 1983-4, Kashgar Prefecture had 6,180 mosques.

In the mid-1980's, there were two million Uyghurs in Kashgar Prefecture and 360,000 Han Chinese.

Population by ethnicity

Historical maps
Historical English-language maps including modern-day Kashgar Prefecture area:

See also
First East Turkestan Republic
Shaksgam River
Tumxuk

Notes

References

External links 
 Building a New Old Kashgar

 
Prefecture-level divisions of Xinjiang